There are two isomers of propanol.  

1-Propanol, n-propanol, or propan-1-ol : CH3CH2CH2OH, the most common meaning
2-Propanol, Isopropyl alcohol, isopropanol, or propan-2-ol : (CH3)2CHOH

See also
 Propanal  (propionaldehyde) differs in spelling from propanol by a single letter and is a different compound.
 Propranolol is a drug used for reducing blood pressure and hand tremors.

Alkanols